Pelurga is a genus of moths in the family Geometridae erected by Jacob Hübner in 1825.

Species
Pelurga comitata (Linnaeus, 1758) – dark spinach
Pelurga onoi (Inoue, 1965)
Pelurga taczanowskiaria (Oberthür, 1880)

References

Larentiini